Dethalbum III is the third full-length album by virtual death metal band Dethklok, from the Adult Swim animated series Metalocalypse. The CD and deluxe CD/DVD were released on October 16, 2012. It contains music from the second, third and fourth seasons of the show. Like The Dethalbum and Dethalbum II before it, the music is performed by the show's creator Brendon Small and drummer Gene Hoglan. Additionally, the band's live bassist, Bryan Beller, performs on the album.

Release
The single "I Ejaculate Fire" was released on September 4, 2012. The song "Crush the Industry" premiered on Full Metal Jackie on September 14, 2012. The song "Andromeda" premiered on Liquid Metal on September 24, 2012. The song "The Galaxy", along with its music video, premiered on Hot Topic's YouTube channel on October 3, 2012. The album was also released on vinyl on November 6, 2012.

A guitar transcription book for this album was released in April 2013 through Alfred Music Publishing.

Reception

The album peaked at number 10 on the Billboard 200 chart, selling over 20,000 copies in its first week of release. This overtook Dethalbum II as the highest charting death metal album.

Track listing

Personnel

Virtual personnel from Metalocalypse
Nathan Explosion – vocals
Pickles – drums
Skwisgaar Skwigelf – lead guitar
Toki Wartooth – rhythm guitar
William Murderface – bass guitar
Magnus Hammersmith – rhythm guitar ("The Hammer")

Production
 Dethklok – production
 Abigail Remeltindrinc – production
 Dick "Magic Ears" Knubbler – engineering
 Charles Offdensen – legal
 All songs recorded at Dethklok Studios in Mordhaus and in the Dethsub in Andromeda's Crevice.

Actual personnel
Brendon Small – vocals, guitar, keyboards, production
Gene Hoglan – drums
Bryan Beller – bass guitar

Production
Ulrich Wild – production, engineering
Antonio Cannobio – cover art
R. Chett Hoffman – direction, editing (for the documentary)

References

2012 albums
Dethklok albums
Williams Street Records albums
Albums produced by Ulrich Wild